Skhakot railway station is  located in  Pakistan.

See also
 List of railway stations in Pakistan
 Pakistan Railways

References

External links

Railway stations in Khyber Pakhtunkhwa
Defunct railway stations in Pakistan
Railway stations on Nowshera–Dargai Railway Line